Elysion is a Greek gothic metal band from Athens, Greece, formed in 2006.

The band members are Christiana Hatzimihali (lead vocals), Johnny Zero (guitar), AR (bass guitar), Nid (guitar) and Laitsman (drums).

History

Silent Scream 
The band released its debut studio album, Silent Scr3am, on 18 December 2009 on the Massacre Records label. It was produced and mixed by Mark Adrian and was mastered by Ted Jensen.

The album was met with mostly average to positive reviews. Femmetal Online gave the album a high rating, stating that "[t]he songs on 'Silent Scream' are so unrelenting and infectious that I had a hard time finding any fault at all with this CD. The sound and production is excellent and the band worked with American engineer Ted Jensen." The German edition of Metal Hammer gave the album an average rating, calling it a "potential sensation" although the tracks were not found to be innovative.

Someplace Better 
On 24 January 2014, Elysion released its new album called Someplace Better, produced by Mark Adrian at ARTemis Studios in Athens, Greece, mixed by Dan Certa (We Are The Fallen, Ben Moody, Seether) and mastered by David Collins (Black Sabbath, Alice Cooper, Mötley Crüe). Gustavo Sazes, who already worked for bands like Arch Enemy or Morbid Angel, is responsible for the cover artwork.

Bring Out Your Dead 

On 8 February 2023, Elysion released Crossing Over, the first release of their new album Bring Out Your Dead set to be released on 17 March 2023.

Band members

Current line-up 
Andreas "AR" Roufagalas - bass guitar (2022-present)
Nikos "NiD" Despotopoulos - lead guitars (2006–present)
Ilias P. "Laitsman" Laitsas - drums (2009–present)
Giannis "Johnny Zero" Giannikos - rhythm guitars, keyboards (2006–present)
Christiana Hatzimihali - lead vocals (2008–present)
Former members
Antonios "Anthony FXF" Bofilakis - bass guitar (2006–2022)
Petros Fatis - drums (2006-2009)
Maxi Nil - lead vocals (2006-2008)

Timeline

Discography

Albums 
Silent Scr3am (2009)
Someplace Better (2014)
Bring Out Your Dead (2023)

EPs
Killing My Dreams (2012)

Demo recordings 
 Elysion (2006)

Awards and nominations 

|-
|2006 ||  Elysion (demo) || Best Demo Record in Metal Hammer magazine ||  
|-
|2007 ||  Elysion || Best New Act in Fillipos Nakas Award ||  
|-
|2007 ||  Elysion || Best Rock Band in Fillipos Nakas Music Award  ||  
|-

See also 

List of alternative-metal artists
List of gothic-metal bands
List of Greek musical artists
Music of Greece

References

External links 

2006 establishments in Greece
21st-century Greek musicians
Alternative metal musical groups
Greek gothic metal musical groups
Musical groups from Athens
Musical groups established in 2006
Musical quintets